Harsha N. Devani (born 27 March 1958) is an Indian Judge. She is former  Judge of Gujarat High Court.

Life 
Harsha N. Devani was born on 27 March 1958 in Kunkavav, Amreli district, Gujarat. She completed her secondary school education from Prakash Higher Secondary School, Ahmedabad; Convent Little Flower School, Dibrugarh, Assam; and Loreto Convent, Ranchi. She completed B. Sc. in Microbiology from M.G. Science Institute, Ahmedabad; M. Sc. in Microbiology from School of Science, Gujarat University; and LL.B. from Sir L.A. Shah Law College, Ahmedabad.

She started her career as a lawyer on 10 July 1992. She was appointed as the Additional Judge of Gujarat High Court on 8 October 2004 and later as the Permanent Judge on 9 August 2007.

She was one of two judges who heard appeals in the 2002 Naroda Patiya massacre case.

She was retired on 26 March 2020.

References

1958 births
Living people
20th-century Indian lawyers
21st-century Indian judges
20th-century Indian women lawyers
21st-century Indian women judges
Gujarati people
Judges of the Gujarat High Court
People from Amreli district
Gujarat University alumni